The 38th District of the Iowa Senate is located in eastern Iowa, and is currently composed of Benton, Iowa, and Poweshiek Counties.

Current elected officials
Dawn Driscoll is the senator currently representing the 38th District.

The area of the 38th District contains two Iowa House of Representatives districts:
The 75th District (represented by Thomas Gerhold)
The 76th District (represented by David Maxwell)

The district is also located in Iowa's 1st congressional district, which is represented by Ashley Hinson.

Past senators
The district has previously been represented by:

Emil Husak, 1983–1992
O. Gene Maddox, 1993–2002
Neal Schuerer, 2003–2004
Tom Rielly, 2005–2012
Tim Kapucian, 2013–2021
Dawn Driscoll, 2021–present

See also
Iowa General Assembly
Iowa Senate

References

38